Nordbat, short for Nordic Battalion may refer to::

Nordbat 1, Nordic Battalion in Republic of Macedonia from January 1993 until 1994.
Nordbat 2, Nordic Battalion part of UNPROFOR in Bosnia from October 1993 until April 1994.